Everson Bispo Pereira (born 24 July 1997), simply known Everson, is a Brazilian footballer who plays as a central defender.

Career

Club
Everson made his professional debut for Bahia in a 1-1 Campeonato Brasileiro Série A tie with Coritiba on 20 September 2017. On 15 July 2019, Everson joined Portimonense on loan in the Portuguese Primeira Liga.

On 22 July 2022, FC Urartu announced the signing pf Everson. On 13 December 2022, Everson left Urartu by mutual consent having played five times for the club.

International
Everson represented the Brazil U20s in a 2-1 win over the Uruguay U20s on 15 October 2016.

References

External links

1997 births
Living people
Sportspeople from Salvador, Bahia
Brazilian footballers
Brazilian expatriate footballers
Brazil under-20 international footballers
Brazil youth international footballers
Association football defenders
Portimonense S.C. players
Esporte Clube Bahia players
Primeira Liga players
Campeonato Brasileiro Série A players
Paraná Clube players
Brazilian expatriate sportspeople in Portugal
Expatriate footballers in Portugal